Spa towns in Serbia are rich in mineral water, mud, air, or other characteristics that help or facilitate discomfort, speed up healing or recovering, or otherwise assist the healing process. There are over 40 spas in Serbia, and over 400,000 people visit them annually. The most well-known and visited spas in Serbia are Vrnjačka Banja, Banja Koviljača, Bukovička Banja, Sokobanja and Niška Banja.

List 
The following is a list of spa towns in Serbia.

See also 
 List of spa towns

Notes and references
Notes:

References:

External links
 Banje i klimatska mesta at serbia.travel 

 
Towns (spa)
Serbia